Grand Island may refer to:

Places

United States
Grand Island, California, a community in Colusa County
Grand Island (California), an island in the Sacramento-San Joaquin River Delta
Grand Island, Florida, a community
Grand Island, Nebraska, a city
 Grand Island (Nebraska), a former island on the Wood and Platte Rivers; original site of the city
Grand Island, New York, a town and island in the Niagara River
Grand Island (Massachusetts), an island
Grand Island Township, Michigan, on an island of the same name in Lake Superior
Grand Island National Recreation Area, located on the same island

Other countries
Ilha Grande, in Brazil
Grand Island (Balsam Lake) in Balsam Lake in Canada
Grand Jason Island, sometimes known as "Grand Island", in the Falkland Islands
Isla Grande, in Panama

Other
Grand Island (band), a Norwegian rock band

See also
 Grand Isle (disambiguation)
 Grande Île (disambiguation)
 Grand Island Senior High School (disambiguation)